Cho Hong-Kyu (born 24 July 1983) is a South Korean football player who previously played for Daegu FC, Pohang Steelers and Daejeon Citizen.

Club career 
Cho joined Daegu FC as a draft player for the 2006 season.  While little more than a squad player during 2006 making only intermittent appearances during the season, Cho was a regular starter during the 2007 season.  Seeing little matchplay in 2008, Cho transferred to the Pohang Steelers for the 2009 season.  Despite the move, Cho still struggled to establish himself as a first choice at the Steelers, and has made the move to Daejeon Citizen for the 2011 K-League season.

Club career statistics

References

External links 

1983 births
Living people
Association football defenders
South Korean footballers
Daegu FC players
Pohang Steelers players
K League 1 players
Sangji University alumni
Sportspeople from Busan